Lychakiv Cemetery, officially State History and Culture Museum-Preserve "Lychakiv Cemetery", is a historic cemetery in Lviv, Ukraine.

History

Since its creation in 1787 as Łyczakowski Cemetery, it has been the main necropolis of the city's (at the time named Lemberg) intelligentsia, middle and upper classes. Initially the cemetery was located on several hills in the borough of Lychakiv, following the imperial Austro-Hungarian (the city was located in Austria-Hungary at the time) edict ordering that all cemeteries be moved outside of the city limits.

In mid-1850s the cemetery was expanded significantly by Tytus Tchórzewski, who created the present network of alleys and round-abouts. It then became the main city cemetery, and soon most other cemeteries were closed. The two largest that remained were the Yanivskiy Cemetery, with many working class graves and the adjacent New Jewish Cemetery. Lychakivskiy Cemetery was used by all Christian sects in the city: in addition to Roman Catholics, it also included Eastern Rite Catholics, Protestants and Orthodox.

After World War II the city (at the time named Lwów) was annexed (from the Second Polish Republic) by the Soviet Union to the Ukrainian Soviet Socialist Republic. The majority of the surviving pre-war inhabitants of the city were expelled to the former German areas awarded to Poland after the Yalta Conference. This started a period of devastation of historical monuments located at the cemetery. Up to 1971 many of the sculptures were destroyed. However, in 1975 the cemetery was declared a historical monument and the degradation ended. Since the late 1980s, the cemetery has seen constant rebuilding and refurbishment and continues to be one of the principal tourist attractions of Lviv.

In late 2006 the city administration announced plans to transfer the tombs of Stepan Bandera, Yevhen Konovalets, Andriy Melnyk and other key leaders of Organization of Ukrainian Nationalists (OUN) / Ukrainian Insurgent Army (UPA) to a new area of the cemetery dedicated to the Ukrainian national liberation struggle.

Cemetery sections

Ukrainian National Army Memorial 
The Ukrainian National Army Memorial (Number 8 on the plan) is devoted to the Ukrainian National Army soldiers buried in the cemetery, including soldiers of the SS Division "Galicia". It was established due to the efforts of Ukrainian national-patriotic organizations and the Ukrainian emigrant veterans' movement.

Field of Mars 
On the north side of the Cemetery is situated Field of Mars (No. 1 on the plan), a war memorial built in 1974. This war memorial contains the graves of 3,800 Soviet soldiers who died in the battles against the Nazi occupiers during World War II) (named Great Patriotic War in Soviet ideology) and against units of Ukrainian Insurgent Army (UPA) (acting up to the mid-1950s). On the wall of the memorial was written a verses:  Poetic writing in honor of the Soviet soldiers was eliminated at the direction of urban authorities in 1990s.

Lwów Defenders' Cemetery 

The Cemetery of the Defenders of Lwów (Cemetery of Eaglets) is a memorial and a burial place for the Poles and their allies who died in Lviv during the hostilities of the Polish-Ukrainian War (1918−1919) and Polish-Soviet War (1919−1921).

The complex is a part of the city's historic Lychakiv Cemetery. There are about 3000 graves in that part of the cemetery; some from the Lwów Eaglets young militia volunteers, after whom that part of the cemetery is named. It was one of the most famous necropolises of the interwar Poland. Lviv was a city in interwar Poland and at the time named Lwów.

In 1925, the ashes of one of the unknown defenders of Lwów were transferred to the Tomb of the Unknown Soldier in Warsaw. After that was built the «Polish mausoleum» (Lwów Eaglets Memorial).

After World War II the cemetery of Lwów Eaglets was completely destroyed and turned into a truck depot and at one time Eaglets Cemetery was damaged with a bulldozer.

Due to the history of complex Polish-Ukrainian relations, the Polish Eaglets Cemetery was neglected because the Ukrainian authorities did not want to rebuild this monument of young Polish soldiers defending the city in 1920s. Though in the late 1980s, workers of a Polish company which were working in Khmelnytskyi started to redecorate and rebuild the necropolis from its ruins (which was not always legal according to Ukrainian law). Although the Ukrainian authorities tried to stop the works several times, the Poles managed to renovate this important memorial of great Lvovians.

Since 1999 there is also a monument to the Sich Riflemen located just outside the Polish mausoleum.

Since the fall of communism, the cemetery had been rebuilt and refurbished. It was finally reopened on 24 June 2005.

1863 January rebels' hill 
In the back part of the cemetery (No. 6 on the plan) on a separate field indicated original steel crosses, located «1863 rebels' hill». Buried here are members Polish January Uprising of 1863, of which a member of the Polish Central National Committee Bronisław Szwarce, the famous zoologist Benedykt Dybowski, cornet Vitebsk land, resting under the central monument rebels , etc.

Other veterans' sections
There are also numerous parts of the cemetery in which veterans of most wars of 19th and 20th centuries are buried, including the quarters of veterans of:
 November Uprising (1830−1831)
 World War I
 Polish Defensive War (1939)
 Victims of the NKVD (1941)
World War II

Notable people

Poles
Since the city for centuries used to be a centre of Polish culture, there are numerous famous Poles buried there. Among them are:
 Roman Abraham, general
 Stefan Banach, mathematician
 Wladyslaw Belza, writer
 Piotr Chmielowski, philosopher
 Benedykt Dybowski, soldier, adventurer, ethnologist and biologist
 Mieczysław Garsztka, aviator
 Mieczysław Gębarowicz, historian
 Tadeusz Jordan-Rozwadowski, Polish military leader and one of the founders of modern Poland
 Franciszek Ksawery Godebski, historian
 Zygmunt Gorgolewski, architect, designer of the Lviv Opera
 Seweryn Goszczyński, poet
 Artur Grottger, artist
 , founder of the first theatre in Lwów
 Wojciech Kętrzyński, historian and name-sake of the city of Kętrzyn
 Maria Konopnicka, writer
 Juliusz Konstanty Ordon, officer
 Ludwik Rydygier, surgeon
 Władysław Sadłowski, architect
 Kazimierz Sichulski, painter
 Karol Szajnocha, historian
 Julian Zachariewicz, architect
 Gabriela Zapolska, novelist and playwright

Ukrainians
Among the notable Ukrainians buried there are:
 Oleksander Barvinsky, academician, politician.
 Vasyl Barvinsky, impressionist composer
 Yevheniya Barvinska, pianist, choral conductor, singer
 Roman Bezpalkiv, Ukrainian painter
 Ivan Franko, poet and reformer of the Ukrainian language
 Yaroslav Halan, playwright and publicist
 Jacques Hnizdovsky, painter, printmaker, sculptor, bookplate designer and illustrator of numerous books, both in Ukrainian and English
 Volodymyr Ivasyuk, composer
 , theologian
 Solomiya Krushelnytska, soprano opera star
Lesya Kryvytska, actress
 Stanyslav Lyudkevych, composer
 Oleksander Ohonovsky, lawyer, civic leader
 Anthony Petrushevych, historian and philologist.
 Markiyan Shashkevych, poet
 Yurii Shukhevych, political prisoner and politician
 Oleksandr Tysowskyj (alternately Alexander Tysovsky), founder of Ukrainian Scouting
 Anatole Vakhnianyn, composer and leading cultural figure
 Iryna Vilde (Polotniuk), Ukrainian writer
 , hero of Ukraine, academician, director of the Lviv National Gallery
 , Chief Scout of Plast from 1972 to 1991

Others
 Edmund Pike Graves, pilot and member of the Kościuszko Squadron

Gallery

References

External links

 Detailed history of the Cemetery 
 Pictures of the Cemetery. 288 photo. V.Yashchuk
 Pictures of the Cemetery 
 More pictures of the Cemetery (captions in Polish)
 Pictures of Defenders of Lwów Cemetery 
 Lychakivskiy Cemetery on city plan: F-9; Inter-war cemetery list, p. 23, Plan Lwowa, W. Horbay, 1938 (in Polish; reprinted Wrocław, 1986).
 Review of Cemetery as tourist attraction
 Article about Cemeteries Tourist
 Lychakivskiy Cemetery at Find a Grave

Cemeteries in Lviv
Polish culture
Tourist attractions in Lviv
1787 establishments in the Habsburg monarchy
Poland–Ukraine relations